Romance de fieras ("Romance of Beasts") is a 1954 Mexican film. It stars Carlos Orellana.

Cast
 Armando Calvo - Ricardo Narváez
 Martha Roth - Gabriela de Alba
 Joaquín Cordero - Lic. Javier Ponce
 Carlos Orellana - Don Carlos Narváez
 Verónica Loyo - Patricia
 Emma Rodríguez - Magda
 María Gentil Arcos - Tía Milagros
 Conchita Gentil Arcos - Tía Remedios
 Guillermo Bravo Sosa - Juan el Capataz
 Agustín de la Lanza - Luisito
 Julio Daneri - Federico de Alba
 Julio Sotelo - Juez

External links
 

1954 films
1950s Spanish-language films
Mexican crime films
1950s crime films
Films directed by Ismael Rodríguez
1950s Mexican films